Don't Lose This is a 2015 posthumous album by the late bospel and R&B musician Pops Staples. The album was put together with various musicians, using unfinished tracks from 1998 that were intended for a "lost" album for The Staple Singers. The album was produced by Jeff Tweedy of Wilco. The album reached #16 on the Independent Albums chart.

History

The title of the album comes from words that Staples spoke to his daughter Mavis Staples just prior to his death. He told her, "don't lose this, here," referring to 10 recordings that he made in 1998. Mavis teamed up with Jeff Tweedy in 2014 to produce the tracks and finish the album. Tweedy had previously produced Mavis' albums You Are Not Alone and One True Vine. Tweedy played bass on the album and his son Spencer played drums.

Track listing
All tracks composed by Pops Staples; except where indicated

Personnel
Pops Staples - guitar, vocals
Mavis Staples - vocals on "Sweet Home", "Love on My Side" and "Better Home"
Jeff Tweedy - guitar on "Sweet Home", "Love on My Side" and "Will the Circle Be Unbroken"; bass
Tom Grady - bass
Scott Ligon - piano
Spencer Tweedy, Tim Austin - drums
Cleotha Staples, Mavis Staples, Yvonne Staples - backing vocals

References 

2015 albums
Albums produced by Jeff Tweedy
DBpm Records albums
Pops Staples albums